RVU may refer to:

 Rocky Vista University College of Osteopathic Medicine
 RVU Alliance
 RVU protocol
 Relative Value Units in healthcare management systems, specifically Medicare
 Radio Volks Universiteit, a former educational broadcaster in The Netherlands, now merged into Omroep NTR